Atsumi (written: 渥美 or 温海) may refer to:

People
Atsumi (name)

Places
, former town in  Atsumi District, Aichi Prefecture, Japan
, former district in Aichi Prefecture, Japan
, peninsula in Aichi Prefecture, Japan
, former town in Nishitagawa District, Yamagata Prefecture, Japan